Talat Noi Subdistrict may refer to:
Talat Noi, a neighbourhood and subdistrict (khwaeng) in Bangkok
Talat Noi, a subdistrict (tambon) in Ban Mo District, Saraburi Province